Johann Christoph Schmidt (3 March 1683 – January 1763) was a musician and music copyist to Handel. After settling in London, he anglicized his name to John Christopher Smith; to avoid confusion with his son of the same name, he is referred to as John Christopher Smith sr. He may also be referred to as "John Christopher Smith the elder".

Born in Kitzingen, Smith sr. probably studied at Halle, where he met Handel. He moved in 1705 to Nuremberg, and then, a couple of years later, to Ansbach. In Ansbach he was a wool merchant and amateur musician, until about 1716 when Handel visited and convinced him to move and become a professional musician. By 1720, he and his family had settled in London, where he was making a living as a viola player and as Handel's copyist, as Handel's treasurer, and through his music shop in Coventry Street. Smith sr. employed his wife and children as copyists, including his son John Christopher Smith, who became Handel's amanuensis later on.

Smith sr. and Handel worked well together and were close friends until the late 1740s, when Smith sr. tried to persuade Handel to co-operative with the Middlesex Opera Company.  Relations between the two men grew worse, and they were estranged for much of the 1750s.  John Smith jr. managed to reconcile them shortly before Handel's death.

Further reading
 W. Dean, "Handel's Early London Copyists", Essays on Opera (Oxford, 1990).
 J. S. Hall, "John Christopher Smith, Handel's Friend and Sectretary", Musical Times 96/1345 (1955), .
 K. Sasse, "Neue Daten zu Johann Christoph Schmidt", Händel-Jahrbuch 3 (1957).

References

1683 births
1763 deaths
People from Kitzingen
Music copyists